Paris Saint-Germain Football Club (PSG) is the most popular football club in France and one of the most widely supported teams in the world. Famous PSG fans include Nicolas Sarkozy, Tony Parker, Fabio Quartararo, Tom Brady, Patrick Dempsey, Victoria Azarenka, Teddy Riner and DJ Snake.

Lacking a big passionate fanbase, the club began offering cheaper season tickets to young supporters in 1976. These fans were placed in the Kop K, located in the K section of the Paris stand at the Parc des Princes. Following an increase in ticket prices, Kop K supporters moved to the Boulogne stand in 1978, and the Kop of Boulogne (KoB) was born. There, the club's first Italian-style ultra group, Boulogne Boys, was founded in 1985. Other KoB groups, however, took British hooligans as dubious role models and violence rapidly escalated. PSG supporters' groups have been linked to football hooliganism ever since.

PSG owners Canal+ responded in 1991 by encouraging and financing non-violent fans of the KoB stand to take place in the Auteuil stand at the other end of the Parc des Princes. The Virage Auteuil was born, alongside Supras Auteuil, its most notorious ultras. At first the measure worked but, slowly, a violent rivalry arose between the two stands. Things came to a head in 2010 before a match against Le Classique arch-rivals Olympique de Marseille in Paris. Boulogne fan Yann Lorence was killed following a fight between groups from both stands outside the Parc des Princes, forcing PSG president Robin Leproux to take action.

The club exiled the supporters' groups from the Parc des Princes and banned them from all PSG matches in what was known as Plan Leproux. It made PSG pay the price in terms of atmosphere, with one of Europe's most feared venues now subdued. For their part, former Virage Auteuil supporters formed the Collectif Ultras Paris (CUP) in February 2016, with the aim of reclaiming their place at the stadium. In October 2016, after a six-year absence, the club agreed to their return. Grouped in the Auteuil end of the stadium, the CUP currently is the only ultra association officially recognized by PSG. The ultra movement has also started to come back to life in the Boulogne stand. New groups Block Parisii, Paname Rebirth and Résistance Parisienne are trying to convince the club of relaunching the Kop of Boulogne.

Supporters' groups

Paris Saint-Germain is the most popular football club in France with 22% of fans identifying as Parisians. Olympique de Marseille come second with 20%, while Olympique Lyonnais is third with 14%. PSG is also one of the most widely supported teams with 35 million supporters worldwide, more than any other French club.

The Parc des Princes has been the home stadium of the capital club since 1974. The pitch of the stadium is surrounded by four covered all-seater stands, officially known as Tribune Borelli, Tribune Auteuil, Tribune Paris and Tribune Boulogne. Historically, PSG's most hardcore fans have occupied the Auteuil and Boulogne stands. Boulogne Boys, Supras Auteuil and the Collectif Ultras Paris (CUP) have been the club's most famous supporters' groups. PSG also has a large number of fan clubs in France and worldwide, called PSG Fan Clubs.

Grouped in the Auteuil end of the stadium, the CUP is the only ultra association officially recognized by PSG and has around 3,000 members. It consists of six subgroups: K-Soce Team, Liberté Pour les Abonnés, Le Combat Continue, Nautecia, Parias Cohortis and Urban Paris.

The CUP share the stadium with Tribune Boulogne ultra group Résistance Parisienne, PSG Junior Club at the Tribune Borelli, and Tribune Paris groups Le Club des Amis du PSG, PSG Grand Sud, and Handicap PSG. Other active groups include former CUP subgroup Karsud, who have been banned from the Parc des Princes since 2017.

Active

 Tribune Auteuil
 Collectif Ultras Paris (2016)
 CUP gathers 6 groups:
 K-Soce Team (2007)
 Liberté Pour les Abonnés (2010)
 Le Combat Continue (2012)
 Nautecia (2012)
 Parias Cohortis (2013)
 Urban Paris (2017)

 Tribune Paris
 3 groups:
 Le Club des Amis du PSG (1975)
 PSG Grand Sud (1995)
 Handicap PSG (2005)

 Tribune Borelli
 1 group:
 PSG Junior Club (2012)

 Tribune Boulogne
 1 group:
 Résistance Parisienne (2019)

 Banned from Parc des Princes
 1 group:
 Tribune Auteuil
 Karsud (1994)

Dissolved

 Before Parc des Princes
 1 group:
 Le Club des Associés (1970–1972)

 Tribune Auteuil
 13 groups:
 Auteuil Fanatics (1989–1991)
 Supras Auteuil (1991–2010)
 Lutèce Falco (1991–2010)
 Incorrigibles Gaulois (1991–1992)
 Tigris Mystic (1993–2006)
 Titans (1993–2010)
 Dragon's (1993–1997)
 Kriek (1999–2010)
 Microbes Paris (2006–2017)
 Auteuil Rouge (2008–2009)
 Grinta (2009–2010)
 Lista Nera Paris (2009–2017)
 Ferveur Parisienne (2017–2022)

 Tribune Boulogne
 24 groups:
 Boulogne Boys (1985–2008)
 Commando Pirate Paris (1985–1993)
 Firebirds (1986–1993)
 Gavroches de Paris (1986–2010)
 Head-Hunter (1989–1992)
 Paris Assas Club (1989–2010)
 Pitbull Kop (1989–1992)
 Army Korps (1991–1993)
 Rangers (1992–2010)
 Sus Scrofa (1992–1995)
 Casual Firm (1993–2010)
 Indépendants Boulogne Rouge (1993–2000)
 Kaos (1993–1995)
 S.K. (1993–1998)
 Block B (1994)
 Génération Parisienne (1994–1998)
 Parc Kaos (1994–1996)
 Crazy Gang (1997–2000)
 Section Cigogne (1997–2010)
 Layache Family (2001–2010)
 Commando Loubard (2003–2010)
 Milice Paris (2006–2010)
 Tifo e Stupido B3 Dark Side (2009–2010)
 Paname Rebirth (2018–2021)

 Tribune Paris
 5 groups:
 Juniors PSG / Kop K (1976–1978)
 Hoolicool (1993–2013)
 Authentiks (2002–2010)
 Puissance Paris (2003–2010)
 Brigade Paris (2006–2010)

 Tribune Borelli
 3 groups:
 Capitals (1993–1998)
 Titi-Fosi (1995–2018)
 Vikings 27 (2001–2011)

 Protest groups during Plan Leproux
 4 groups:
 Catégorie D 
 Le Parc C'était Mieux Avant
 Les Brothers
 Paname United Colors

History

Early years

During their first three years of existence, Paris Saint-Germain were fan-owned and had 14,820 socios (members), who paid an annual fee of 25 to 40 francs (4 to 6 euros). The socios were the club's first supporters. As such, they founded Le Club des Associés (The Club of Socios) to organize travels for PSG home and away matches. It was PSG and France's first supporters' group. More than 2,000 socios attended the club's first match ever on 1 August 1970. It was a friendly against Quevilly (1–3 loss) at the Stade Jean-Bouin.

After PSG's 2–1 win over Brest in the 1970–71 French Division 2 in October 1970, players from the visiting team complained about the hostile atmosphere produced by the home supporters. The Parisian players were delighted, though. PSG defender Roland Mitoraj told reporters in February 1971 that he had never experienced this kind of support when he played for Saint-Étienne. In May 1971, for the decisive top-of-the-table clash versus Rouen, 5,000 socios travelled to Normandy.

The following season, the club's first in Ligue 1, PSG faced Lille in January 1972 as both sides battled to avoid relegation. PSG won 3–1 with the 1,200 socios in attendance unfurling a banner that read "PSG salutes Lille! Long live football and may the best one win!" But the club split shortly after and PSG were administratively relegated to Division 3. Paris FC stayed in Ligue 1 and an overwhelming majority of socios preferred to support them. In consequence, Le Club des Associés ceased to exist as well.

PSG still had some supporters, though. They surprised the players with streamers and trumpets during their French Cup match against Rouen in Mantes in January 1973. On 10 November 1973, PSG played their first match at the Parc des Princes versus Ligue 2 promotion rivals Red Star, winning 3–1. Before kickoff, the team warmed up in front of their fans at the Boulogne stand. It was the beginning of a tradition that still stands today. PSG returned to Ligue 1 in 1974, immediately moving into the Parc as Paris FC had been relegated that same year. On 13 August 1974, PSG recorded a 2–2 draw against Metz in front of nearly 14,000 spectators during their maiden home match in the top-flight. The club's oldest active supporters' group, Le Club des Amis du PSG (The Club of Friends of PSG), was founded in January 1975. Its members settled in the Paris stand with a banner: "The Spirit Club."

Kop of Boulogne

Back then, the majority of people attending the Parc des Princes were casual spectators or away supporters, and the stadium was only full when Paris faced prestigious sides like Saint-Étienne, Nantes, Marseille or Reims. In response, the club put in place a subscription plan called Young PSG Supporters in 1976, placing its subscribers in the K section, the first fan-dedicated space at the Parc. They named it Kop K in reference to the famous Spion Kop stand in Anfield that groups the supporters of Liverpool.

Kop K went from 500 subscribers against Reims in September 1976 to 3,000 members in early 1977. Following an increase in ticket prices in 1978, Kop K supporters moved to the Boulogne stand and the Kop K became the Kop of Boulogne (KoB). PSG players had been warming up there since 1973, so the supporters were logically invested in being closer to their idols.

United under a bulldog's head on top of the French flag, the KoB was mainly composed of three types of fans: Italian-style ultras (e.g. Boulogne Boys, Gavroches, Firebirds, Rangers, Tifo e Stupido, Sus Scrofa, Kaos and S.K.); English-inspired kopistes (e.g. Paris Assas Club, Head-Hunter, Génération Parisienne, Parc Kaos, Section Cigogne, Crazy Gang and Layache Family); and hooligans influenced by casual culture, far-right views and racist leanings (e.g. Commando Pirate, Pitbull Kop, Army Korps, Casual Firm, Indépendants Boulogne Rouge, Block B, Commando Loubard and Milice Paris).

PSG and the CUP first agreed a Parc des Princes return for the 2–0 home league win over Bordeaux in October 2016. Around 150 ultras were allowed to enter the Auteuil stand after six years of absence. Believing that the lack of support was partially guilty for their premature UEFA Champions League exits, PSG president Nasser Al-Khelaifi and prominent players, including team captain Thiago Silva, pushed for the return of the ultras. The result was still the same, though, as PSG suffered the ill-fated "Remontada" against Barcelona in March 2017. The ultras greeted the players at the Paris–Le Bourget Airport by blocking their cars and verbally abusing them. Italian midfielder Thiago Motta even knocked over a fan standing in his way.

The ultras have also continued to support the women's side under the banner of the CUP. During the club's 2016–17 UEFA Women's Champions League campaign, they were at the Parc des Princes for the quarterfinals and semifinals versus Bayern Munich and Barcelona respectively. 300 ultras then travelled to Cardiff in June 2017 to cheer the team at the final, which PSG lost to Lyon in the penalty shootout (0–0; 7–6 on penalties).

Internal tensions and boycott

Two new groups, Porte 411 and Urban Paris, joined the CUP in April 2017. The following month, however, the first cracks appeared. Lista Nera Paris and Microbes Paris left the group in May 2017 due to internal disagreements and self-dissolved, while Karsud were excluded from it. Despite this, the club allowed the ultras to hold season tickets together in the Auteuil end in August 2017, a first since 2010. The CUP were then given permission to remake the murals inside the corridors of the Virage Auteuil in June 2018. Supporters began making them in 2005, but were erased in 2010 as part of Plan Leproux. These paintings paid tribute to supporters' groups, deceased members and former players.

PSG also authorized the CUP to unfurl the group's own banner on the billboards of the upper part of Auteuil in August 2018. Other highlights were two Dragon Ball tifos featuring Goku and Shenlong to welcome the players in February 2018 and October 2019. On the downside, after another UEFA Champions League collapse in March 2019, this time against Manchester United, the ultras stormed a training session at the Parc des Princes, proceeding to boo and insult the players.

Tensions between the club and the CUP resurfaced in late October 2019, when the latter announced a boycott of all matches until further notice after, according to the group's statement, "yet another act of provocation orchestrated by people who have never digested the return of the ultras." The CUP then protested in front of the club's headquarters and skipped the team's next match, a decision copied by Boulogne groups Block Parisii and Paname Rebirth. The ultras demanded the departure of both security company OLIPS from the Auteuil stand and two PSG employees, including Jerome Sursin, the club's assistant security director and a former Kop of Boulogne member. In November 2019, the club announced the end of its collaboration with OLIPS, but maintained the two employees targeted by their ultras. Nevertheless, the CUP put an end to their boycott.

Cavani controversy and 30th anniversary of Auteuil

In October 2020, CUP president and leader of subgroup K-Soce Team, Romain Mabille, announced his departure from the ultra group he had led since its creation in 2016. His decision came after internal differences within the CUP. The banners deployed across Paris before September's Le Classique sparked tensions between the subgroups because they weren't collectively debated and validated. Mabille and K-Soce were not involved in this action, which notably aroused widespread indignation.

Mabille's resignation, however, had more to do with his stance over PSG idol Edinson Cavani, whose controversial exit from the club left the CUP divided. Worshipped by the ultras, Cavani rejected a short-term contract extension to play the remaining matches of the coronavirus-stricken 2019–20 UEFA Champions League with the team. Feeling mistreated by the club, he left without acknowledging his time at PSG or even thanking the supporters. Cavani eventually said his goodbyes, but the unilateral decision of a CUP subgroup to praise the Uruguayan striker with a banner was apparently the last straw for Mabille, who was amongst those opposed to pay him tribute.

Nicolas Boffredo, a K-Soce Team affiliate like Mabille, was elected as the new president a few days later. He joined the ultra movement in the 2000s, first frequenting the Virage Auteuil and then becoming a member of the Supras Auteuil in 2002. Likewise, Boffredo went on to be a founding member of both the K-Soce Team in 2007 and the CUP in 2016.

On November 20, 2021, the CUP deployed a multi-part tifo and ignited countless flares during PSG's home league match against Nantes to celebrate the 30th anniversary of the fan-dedicated Virage Auteuil stand, created in the fall of 1991 with the birth of Supras Auteuil, the supporters' group at the origin of the ultra movement in that end of the Parc des Princes. Today, Supras have been absorbed by K-Soce Team, the leading subgroup of the CUP. The tifo paid tribute to Supras Auteuil, Lutèce Falco and Tigris Mystic, the stand's three main fan associations prior to the creation of the CUP, as well as to all seven groups currently part of the tribune: K-Soce Team, Le Combat Continue, Liberté Pour les Abonnés, Nautecia, Parias Cohortis, Porte 411 and Urban Paris. At the end of the match, the players and Mauricio Pochettino, head coach and former PSG player himself, went to celebrate the anniversary with the supporters.

Protests against management and male players

In February 2022, following the club's premature elimination from the Coupe de France, the CUP launched a series of protests against the management and the attitude of male players with a banner that read "Our patience has limits" during PSG's visit to Lille. It was followed by a statement denouncing the running of the club, including the male team's incoherent sporting plan based on piling up stars, constantly changing managers and the absence of a playing style, and the neglect of the PSG Academy and the women's team by the management.

Demonstrations carried on during PSG's home game versus Rennes. Having been absent for the initial 25 minutes, then silent for the remaining 20 of the first half, the ultras unfurled several banners. "Disrespectful directors, players without desire, shirts without our colors. The only treble for PSG this season," read the most overarching one. Another banner questioned whether it was time for sporting director Leonardo to leave the club, criticizing him for overpaying uncommitted players.

Unrest intensified after PSG crashed out of the UEFA Champions League last-16 for the fourth time in six seasons, self-destructing against Real Madrid in March. The CUP released another statement calling for a complete reorganisation of the club, including the departure of president Nasser Al-Khelaifi. During PSG's next home match versus Bordeaux, the ultras greeted manager Mauricio Pochettino and the team with whistles. Away to Monaco a week later, the CUP fitted their empty stand with a banner: "Like you, we’re on holiday." Home to Lorient in April, the ultras remained muted throughout the game and displayed their main banner upside down.

Amid the protests, Romain Mabille was elected as president of the CUP once more, two years after having resigned. Versus arch-rivals Marseille at home, the Virage Auteuil faithful refrained from supporting the players. The CUP went a step further at Angers, leaving the stadium in the 70th minute. In the following match, Paris secured their tenth Ligue 1 title with a draw over Lens. Despite the occasion, the ultras sat in silence until the 75th minute, when they left to go celebrate the title outside without the players.

During this period, the CUP only halted their protests on behalf of the "exemplary" women's team. They went en masse to the Parc des Princes for the 2021–22 UEFA Women's Champions League quarterfinals against Bayern Munich in March, and then for the semifinals versus Lyon in April. In the latter match, the ultras were part of the club record 43,254 spectators in attendance. Before kick-off, they unfurled a banner reading: "Proud of our colors and proud of our female players."

The CUP finally decided to bury the hatchet during PSG's last match of the campaign against Metz at the Parc des Princes in May. With guarantees from the club regarding serious changes for next season, including Kylian Mbappé's contract renewal, the ultras put their main banner the right way up and encouraged the team in the second half. Their first tribute was dedicated to departing PSG legend Ángel Di María after seven seasons and a club record 112 assists.

Dissolution of Ferveur Parisienne

CUP subgroup Ferveur Parisienne (formerly Porte 411) were dissolved by the French government in December 2022 due to an extensive criminal record and having caused several injuries. They had notably taken part in the fan brawl at the Stade Charléty in September 2021 during the Coupe de France match pitching Paris FC against Lyon, for which PSG banned them several matches from the Parc des Princes. The decree also listed twenty other acts of violence, including property damage and gun possession, committed between November 2019 and October 2022.

New groups in Boulogne

Coexistence with the CUP

In September 2017, the first Boulogne supporters' group since Plan Leproux, Block Parisii, was born. They were soon joined by Paname Rebirth in 2018 and Résistance Parisienne in 2019. These new associations, which according to their leaders are not linked with former Boulogne groups, aim to convince the club of relaunching the Kop of Boulogne, in the same way they did with the Virage Auteuil and the Collectif Ultras Paris. PSG has not officially recognised these groups out of fear of provoking a new war between Boulogne and Auteuil.

Indeed, the relationship with the CUP didn't start well, with the latter stealing part of Block Parisii's paraphernalia before returning them. The CUP initially believed that, like former Boulogne groups, the Block were also made of far-right extremists and racists. However, exchanges during away games smoothed the situation as the CUP realized that the new group has an apolitical, nonreligious and anti-violence stance, and its members are Arab, black and white. In March 2018, during PSG's UEFA Champions League tie against Real Madrid at the Parc des Princes, both groups collaborated. Several CUP ultras took place in the Boulogne stand to chant alongside Block members.

Disagreements with the club and suspension

Boulogne groups are allowed to use drums, megaphones and flags, but not to deploy tarpaulins or make tifos like their Auteuil counterparts. While Block Parisii are really careful in their initiatives and Resistance Parisienne are even more confidential, Paname Rebirth have opted for a confrontational approach, which has obviously not helped Boulogne's case with trying to persuade PSG to officially acknowledge them. In July 2019, after the club imposed random placement on them, the Rebirths protested against this measure by deploying a banner on the Boulevard Périphérique that read "Your repression will not stop our ambition."

More recently, the club's management and the media have condemned two controversial banners from the Rebirths. The first one was aimed at Barcelona defender Gerard Piqué's wife Shakira before the club's clash versus the Spanish team in March 2021. The sexist message ("Shakira à la Jonquera") established a link between the Colombian singer and a Catalan town on the French border known for its prostitution hotbeds. In April 2021, their "Crush Munich" banner ahead of PSG's encounter with Bayern Munich in front of the Memorial to Fighting France, a memorial to French soldiers who were executed by German forces during World War II, was deemed insensitive and cause national outrage.

In November 2021, the club suspended the three associations in Boulogne out of fear of a resurgence of the far right. Paname Rebirth and Résistance Parisienne were prohibited from entering Boulogne for six months, while Block Parisii were banned from the Parc des Princes and from traveling for a year. This suspension followed several events at the stadium; a Block Parisii banner deployed against Lyon in September referencing a failed attempt to fight the Lyonnais fans, the recent presence of KoB (Kop of Boulogne) stickers in the stand, and finally the theft of a Paname Rebirth tarpaulin versus RB Leipzig in October. During this assault, claimed by the KoB, racist insults were uttered by the attackers.

Self-dissolutions, return of Résistance Parisienne

Paname Rebirth and Block Parisii self-dissolved in December 2021 and January 2023, respectively, thus leaving Résistance Parisienne as the only Boulogne ultra group currently active. The latter returned to the Boulogne stand in October 2022.

Hooliganism and racism

From Commando Pirate to Karsud

Most Kop of Boulogne (KoB) supporters were poor disaffected white men who made this stand their meeting point thank to its low admission fees. Some of them were influenced by English casual culture. Typified by hooliganism and the wearing of expensive designer clothing, this culture was exported by Liverpool fans in the late 1970s and early 1980s. As a result, the KoB developed into the home of French hooliganism in the mid-1980s. Rival fans, who had always sat in Boulogne, had to be moved across the field to Auteuil, which became the away stand until 1991. This prompted KoB hooligans to form away parties that sneaked through the stands and attacked the visitors.

PSG's first hooligan firm, Commando Pirate, were founded in 1986, followed by Firebirds later that same year. Infiltrated by French far-right extremists since the mid-1980s, the Boulogne stand became overtly racist in 1989 with the creation of Pitbull Kop by radical right political activist Serge Ayoub, who advocated violence and white supremacy. In consequence, the KoB turned into a white-only stand with racist chants (such as "France for the French"), signs, and Nazi salutes as regular features. Pitbull Kop quickly disbanded in 1992, but its racist legacy continued in the stand.

Army Korps were founded in 1991 and they would partake in the Caen incident in 1993. One of French football's darkest moments, it led to the dissolution of Commando Pirate, Army Korps and Firebirds by sports minister of France Michèle Alliot-Marie. Casual Firm and Indépendants Boulogne Rouge (IBR) quickly filled their void in December 1993. These groups were behind most violent episodes of the 1990s. IBR self-dissolved in 2000, but Casual Firm were later joined by Commando Loubard in 2003 and Milice Paris in 2006. The latter two were dissolved by the French government in April 2010, while Casual Firm disbanded a month later.

Created by the club in 1991 to counteract the racism in the stadium, the racially mixed and anti-racist Virage Auteuil stand eventually superseded the less visually impressive and more violent Kop of Boulogne. Nonetheless, Auteuil wasn't exempt from hooliganism and its first hooligan firm, Karsud, were founded in 1994. A few members of Tigris Mystic, initially a peaceful fan group created in 1993, slowly turned into hooligans too, clashing with thugs from other teams as well as those from the KoB and even against Auteuil peers Karsud.

Unlike their politicized peers in the Boulogne stand, Auteuil hooligans started off as purists of urban violence. Simply put, they were apolitical at first. Over time they adopted left-wing ideas which radically opposed the KoB's far-right leanings, and  a deadly conflict arose between the two stands during the 2000s. In July 2006, after several months of clashes with Boulogne hooligans, Tigris Mystic declared it self-dissolved. PSG hooligans were among the most active in Europe until the club enforced a major anti-violence plan in 2010. Karsud are currently the club's most notorious hooligan group still on activity. Made up of around 40 people, they have been banned from the Parc des Princes since 2017.

Incidents

Before Plan Leproux

The first hooligan incidents from Paris Saint-Germain supporters took place during an away game against Nancy in January 1977. Since then, they have clashed with hooligans from all over France, most notably those from big teams such as Saint-Étienne, Nantes, Lyon, Nice and Marseille. PSG radicals have also fought fans from smaller sides like Bastia, Auxerre, Rennes and Tours. In February 1984, they even brawled with English hooligans on the stands of the Parc des Princes during an international match between France and England, leaving dozens injured.

Boulogne hooligans were behind many racist incidents and clashes with the CRS riot police. In 1991, Arab fans were attacked by KoB hooligans. In August 1993, during a match versus Caen, ten CRS officers were injured by PSG hooligans. The brawl began when they entered Boulogne to arrest a fan. Once inside, KoB thugs swarmed over the outnumbered policemen and kicked one of them into a coma. In January 2006, two Arab youths were assaulted by Boulogne affiliates outside the entrance to the stand during a match against Sochaux. In November 2006, six KoB hooligans ambushed a black man after a match at Le Mans. Two of the assailants received prison sentences. Racist fans in the KoB also abused some of their own non-white players, most notably Bernard Lama, George Weah and Vikash Dhorasoo.

Progress in European competition during the 1990s and 2000s saw even more vicious fighting. The Parisian hooligans clashed with opposing thugs from Juventus, Anderlecht, Galatasaray, Chelsea, Arsenal, Bayern Munich, Rangers, CSKA Moscow, Hapoel Tel Aviv and Twente. Even worse, the club's own supporters had turned on each other as well. Following the deaths of two PSG fans, the club implemented an anti-violence plan in May 2010. Officially called Tous PSG (All PSG), but known by supporters as Plan Leproux (referring to PSG’s president Robin Leproux), it exiled all fan groups from the Parc des Princes and banned them from all club matches.

After Plan Leproux

Fan violence largely decreased after Plan Leproux, but incidents still occur. In May 2013, the club's league title celebrations at Trocadero plaza were cut short following fighting between PSG fans and CRS riot police, leaving 30 people injured and leading to 21 arrests. In August 2012, Zlatan Ibrahimović's presentation saw clashes among rival factions of PSG supporters. Between 2010 and 2016, PSG fans also brawled with supporters of Dinamo Zagreb, Bayer Leverkusen and Chelsea. Following years of demonstrations against Plan Leproux, several fan groups formed the Collectif Ultras Paris (CUP) in February 2016. The club allowed their long-awaited comeback in October 2016 for PSG's 2–0 home league win over Bordeaux.

The first incidents since their return occurred in April 2017. PSG ultras damaged areas of the stadium hosting the 2017 Coupe de la Ligue Final. A month later, Lista Nera Paris and Microbes Paris dissociated from the CUP. A third association, Karsud, were excluded from the ultra group. CUP president, Romain Mabille, would later refer to Karsud members as "hooligans who didn't want to respect the code of conduct agreed with the club." Ever since then, members of the CUP, mainly those from leading subgroup K-Soce Team, and Karsud have been in conflict.

In September 2017, ahead of PSG's UEFA Champions League match versus Bayern Munich in Germany, 30 Parisian ultras fought 20 from Bayern fan group Schickeria and 10 reinforcements from Bordeaux. One French fan was treated for a head injury. In October 2018, the CUP clashed against Karsud and twinned Red Star Belgrade hooligan firm Delije near the Parc des Princes after a UCL game. The club reacted by imposing a one-year stadium ban and cancelling season tickets to the 100 CUP members involved, most of them issued from K-Soce Team.

2019 and early 2020 saw a surge in violence. In April, following PSG's defeat to Rennes in the 2019 Coupe de France Final, both set of supporters clashed. In November, the CUP and Karsud fought with thugs from Club Brugge before a UCL match. A week later, K-Soce Team affiliates attacked spectators wearing Marseille apparel during rapper Jul's concert at AccorHotels Arena. Also that month, PSG ultras assaulted Rennes fans who were in Glasgow to face Celtic. In December, the CUP and Boulogne group Block Parisii were involved in a brutal brawl against UCL rivals Galatasaray fans in the streets of Paris. Karsud hooligans then clashed against those of Nantes in February 2020.

Following a quiet period between March 2020 and August 2021 due to the COVID-19 pandemic, which led to lockdowns and restrictions on attendance, fan violence returned in September 2021. Karsud thugs assaulted a member of Rennes fan group Roazhon Celtik Kop (RCK) and stole a club banner. RCK retaliated after Rennes' home league victory over PSG in October 2021, clashing against the Parisian ultras outside the stadium. Karsud, along with CUP subgroup Ferveur Parisienne, were again at the center of controversy during a Coupe de France match between Paris FC and Lyon in December 2021. Wielding iron bars and nunchakus, they attacked the Lyon fans at halftime, which resulted in the game being abandoned and the expulsion of both clubs from the tournament. Ferveur Parisienne were dissolved by the French government in December 2022 mainly because of their involvement in this incident.

Rivalries

Paris Saint-Germain supporters share intense rivalries with fans from Marseille, Juventus, Anderlecht, Galatasaray and Chelsea. Since PSG and Marseille also have a fierce sporting rivalry, known as Le Classique, incidents have been more frequent. Among the most notable are the 146 arrests and nine policemen hospitalised during the French Cup semifinals in April 1995, the Marseille supporter who was left paralysed for life in October 2000 after being struck by a flying seat, and the PSG fan who was hit by a car in October 2009.

The rivalry with Juventus supporters began in October 1983. PSG welcomed The Italian ultras visited Paris for the European Cup Winners' Cup second round, being violently attacked by Boulogne hooligans who invaded the away stand during the game. They brawled again in the 1989–90 UEFA Cup and the 1992–93 UEFA Cup. In April 1993, Juventus hooligans unfurled a banner aimed at their PSG counterparts at the Stadio delle Alpi. As payback, PSG troublemakers beat one Juve supporter unconscious before the return match at the Parc des Princes two weeks later.

Prior to their UEFA Cup third round third round tie in November 1992 at the Parc des Princes, dissolved Boulogne hooligan firm Commando Pirate had a twinning with Anderlecht ultra group O'Side since the early 1980s, and they would occasionally fight together against common enemies. But when O'Side attacked Virage Auteuil members, who were under the wing of Boulogne back then, everything changed. Commando Pirate and Boulogne peers Army Korps came to help Auteuil, severely injuring two Anderlecht fans. Seats flew between the visitors and Auteuil ultras during the game, while Boulogne hooligans clashed again with O'Side after the final whistle.

Matches between PSG and Galatasaray have been classed as high risk since their UEFA Cup Winners' Cup last 16 match at the Parc des Princes in October 1996. Attacked by Boulogne hooligans, the Turkish supporters seriously injured a handful of PSG thugs. The latter hit back during a UEFA Champions League second group stage match in March 2001. After being provoked, Auteuil and Boulogne hooligans, at the time on good terms, attacked the Galatasaray followers in the stands. More than fifty Turks had to be hospitalized in Paris. In December 2019, both teams met for the UCL group stages and violence erupted in the streets of the French capital, leaving one PSG fan with a head trauma and one Galatasaray supporter with a hand injury. During the match, the CUP mocked the Istanbul club's elimination with a banner.

But it was their attack on Chelsea hooligan firm Chelsea Headhunters that earned PSG hooligans high praise on web sites dedicated to football violence. In September 2004, a 150-strong PSG mob assaulted around 50 Chelsea hooligans before their Champions League group stage match in Paris, sparking a rivalry that still stands today. Both teams met again in the 2013–14 UEFA Champions League quarterfinals. Before the first-leg match at the Parc des Princes in April 2014, about 100 fans from each team, including members of former Boulogne hooligan firms, fought in a tourist area of the French capital. Two fans were injured.

Deaths

Julien Quemener

Following a humiliating 4–2 loss in the UEFA Cup to Israeli club Hapoel Tel Aviv at the Parc des Princes, PSG hooligans took the streets and targeted Jewish fans. A French-Jewish supporter of Hapoel, Yaniv Hazout, was surrounded, threatened and subjected to a barrage of racial abuse, when a plain-clothes black police officer, Antoine Granomort, stepped in to help him. Granomort wasn't wearing a police uniform and PSG radicals attacked him. He tried to break up the group with tear gas but was overpowered. Granomort then fired one shot, seriously injuring Mounir Boujaer before killing Julien Quemener.

This episode shocked France. It was only the second fan-related death in the country after that of 1984 when a supporter was killed by a flare. Public opinion blamed the KoB, known for its racist and violent fans since the late 1970s. In turn, PSG supporters and French fans in general considered Quemener a martyr and demanded an inquiry. Prior to PSG's match at Nantes three days after the incident, Boulogne Boys paid their respects to Quemener by marching through the city to the stadium.

Initially, police said Julien Quemener was a member of Boulogne Boys and that this group had links to PSG's violent far-right fans in the KoB. Boys quickly denied the allegations. Later developments in the investigation showed that Quemener was close to Boulogne hooligan firms (Casual Firm, Commando Loubard and Milice Paris) and not Boulogne Boys. In February 2011, after more than four years of investigation, Antoine Granomort was acquitted of murder on the grounds of self-defence.

Yann Lorence

In February 2010, two hours before PSG's 3–0 home defeat to Marseille, the fratricidal war between Boulogne and Auteuil reached a point of no return. A large group of Boulogne hooligans attacked supporters from Auteuil, chasing them toward their entrance into the stadium, all under the eyes of CRS riot police officers, who didn't intervene. Alerted by the situation, many Auteuil fans who were already inside the stadium left the stand to lead a counter charge, which ended in the lynching of Casual Firm member Yann Lorence.

The original reports from the press claimed that Yann Lorence was peacefully leaving a bar when he was attacked by Auteuil fans. For his part, PSG president Robin Leproux said that Lorence had been caught in the middle of the brawl. Boulogne sources defended these theories, saying Lorence had distanced himself from Casual Firm a while back. Auteuil sources, on the other hand, denied these allegations and affirmed that Lorence was indeed part of the fight.

Whatever the case, Lorence died of his injuries in March 2010. His death marked the end of Kop of Boulogne and Virage Auteuil as they had been known. Within the following two months, the French government dissolved several Parisian supporters' groups and the club implemented Plan Leproux, which banned the remaining fan associations from all PSG matches. Two men, Jeremy Banh and Romain Lafon, were subsequently charged with involuntary homicide. Lafon denied his involvement in the incident, whereas Banh admitted in police questioning kicking the victim before withdrawing from the fight. In November 2016, Banh was convicted of killing Lorence and received a five-year jail term, while Lafon was acquitted.

Friendships with other fans

Celtic and Liverpool

Despite their extensive history of hooliganism, Paris Saint-Germain supporters' groups have friendships (called twinnings) with several fan associations from other clubs. Though rarely on the same page, Auteuil and Boulogne both respect supporters from Celtic and Liverpool since they are two of the most important referents within the ultra movement. Celtic's visual approach was an inspiration for Auteuil and ultra groups in general, while Boulogne's history is strongly linked with Liverpool. PSG supporters created the Kop of Boulogne stand back in 1978 as a tribute to the famous Spion Kop stand in Anfield that groups Liverpool's ultras. Celtic and Liverpool fanbases also share many traits, most notably the anthem "You'll Never Walk Alone."

When PSG defeated Celtic at the Parc des Princes for the second round of the UEFA Cup Winners' Cup in October 1995, the Scottish supporters applauded Auteuil at the end of the match to which the PSG ultras responded with "Celtic! Celtic! Celtic!" chants. The two teams met again in the UEFA Champions League group stages in September 2017. After the final whistle at Celtic Park, PSG fans repeated the Celtic chant, while the Scots congratulated them for the win. The return leg in Paris was no different. Both fanbases played a match under the Eiffel Tower and then the PSG supporters unfurled a giant banner at the Parc with the message "You’ll Never Walk Alone."

When Liverpool played PSG in the Cup Winners' Cup semifinals at the Parc in April 1997, Auteuil presented a banner that read "Welcome to the Legendary Fans" and Liverpool's hymn "You'll Never Walk Alone" was respected by both stands when their English counterparts sang it during the game. PSG and Liverpool faced each other again in the Champions League group stages in September 2018. Known for its intimidating atmosphere and noisy supporters, Anfield welcomed 2,500 Parisian ultras from the Collectif Ultras Paris (CUP) who were able to make themselves heard and sometimes even more than the 50,000 supporters of the Reds. After the end of the game, the Liverpool faithful greeted their counterparts with a warm applause.

Opposing alliances

Due to the never-ending violent rivalry between PSG fan groups from Kop of Boulogne and Virage Auteuil, as well as the recent enmity between the CUP and Karsud, twinned supporters have often choose sides in these conflicts. The relationships with Napoli, Hellas Verona and Red Star Belgrade are the perfect examples of this.

Former Boulogne far-right groups are twinned with the ultras of Hellas Verona, while the CUP created a twinning with Napoli's Curva B tifosi in 2017. Both sets of Italian fans don't get along, though. So, after Napoli defeated Hellas in Verona in August 2017, the Hellas Verona ultras — alongside PSG, Lazio and Kaiserslautern hooligans — organized an assault against Napoli's Curva B supporters, their common enemy. Only the work of police forces managed to thwart the aggression. Far-right groups from Metz and hooligan firms from Toulouse (Viola Front, Gitania Tolosa, Camside) are also twinned with now-dissolved KoB associations.

Red Star ultras Delije are twinned with Auteuil hooligan firm Karsud as well as former Boulogne groups. Karsud's link with Delije comes from the fact that some of their leaders have Serbian origin, and they frequently display Serbian flags during PSG games. After the Champions League group stage match between both sides in October 2018, Delije hooligans assaulted members of the CUP near the Parc des Princes. The reason behind the attack was that Karsud have been in conflict with the CUP ever since they were expelled from it in May 2017.

Auteuil and CUP twinnings

Historically, Auteuil groups have been less confrontational than Boulogne supporters. As a result, they have fraternized with more fans from rival teams than their KoB counterparts. The three former major groups in Auteuil (Supras Auteuil, Lutèce Falco and Tigris Mystic), as well as ally association Authentiks from the nearby Paris stand, had twinnings with supporters from other clubs.

Supras Auteuil twinned with Köln ultra group Wilde Horde 96 in 2003. The Germans have continued to pay tribute to Supras even after their dissolution in 2010. During a home match in October 2018, they unfurled a banner that read "25 years of Ultra Mentality" commemorating the 25th anniversary of Supras Auteuil, founded in 1991. Likewise, Authentiks were twinned with supporters of Copenhagen, while Lutèce Falco had friendships with fans of Derry City, whom PSG met in the first round of the UEFA Cup in September 2006, and Celtic.

Finally, Tigris Mystic twinned with Toulon's Irréductibles in 2001 driven by their mutual dislike of Marseille. Both groups assisted to matches together in the past, including one versus Toulouse in 2005 where the Irréductibles even unfurled their own banner at Auteuil. This twinning was continued by the CUP. Members of Irréductibles attended PSG's home match against Nîmes in February 2019 and unfurled a banner in honor of the once-banned PSG fans, who responded with a warm applause and a chant dedicated to the glory of Toulon.

Leading CUP subgroup, K-Soce Team, twinned with Brazilian club Fluminense's ultra groups Sobranada 1902 and Young Flu in 2012 and with Italian side Napoli's Curva B supporters in 2017. These groups have since attended matches from each other together, even unfurling their own banners.

Relationship with players

Fan favorites

Paris Saint-Germain supporters have seen many great players who have lastingly marked the club's history. Some of them have become fan favorites, including, among others, Jean-Pierre Dogliani in the 1970s; Mustapha Dahleb, Safet Sušić and Jean-Marc Pilorget in the 1980s; Bernard Lama, David Ginola, George Weah and Raí in the 1990s; Ronaldinho and Pauleta in the 2000s; Zlatan Ibrahimović, Thiago Silva and Edinson Cavani in the 2010s; and Marco Verratti, Marquinhos, Neymar and Kylian Mbappé in the 2020s.

Historic goals have been a decisive factor in becoming an idol for the fans. Antoine Kombouaré was nicknamed "Gold Helmet" after his last-gasp header versus Real Madrid that sent PSG through to the UEFA Cup semifinals in 1993. Three years later, Bruno Ngotty netted a long-range free kick in the 1996 UEFA Cup Winners' Cup Final against Rapid Wien which gave PSG their only major European title to date. Last but not least, Amara Diané saved PSG from relegation to Ligue 2 on the final match of the 2007–08 season by scoring both goals in their 2–1 win at Sochaux.

A few players are revered by the supporters for their achievements both on and off the field. A big PSG fan, Luis Fernández came through the youth ranks, became team captain and was part of the squad that won the club's first major trophies in the 1980s. He then returned as coach during PSG's golden era in the 1990s, leading them to the UEFA Cup Winners' Cup in 1996. Leonardo, for his part, impressed in his only season in the French capital before coming back in 2011 as sporting director during the Qatari era, signing the next generation of fan favorites.

Like Ronaldinho, other players have also remained in the memory of PSG supporters thanks to their talent despite not staying long at the club nor winning many titles. This is the case of Marco Simone, Jay-Jay Okocha, Nenê and Mikel Arteta. Finally, Jérôme Rothen, Blaise Matuidi and Mamadou Sakho became darlings of the Parc des Princes faithful due to their strong attachment to the Parisian club. In fact, all three of them have been PSG fans since they were kids. Rothen rejected Barcelona, Juventus and Chelsea in 2004 to join dream club Paris Saint-Germain. After his transfer to Liverpool in 2013, beloved academy graduate Sakho came back to bid farewell to the club and thank the supporters before a PSG home match. Matuidi is held in high regard because he offered his support for the return of the banned PSG ultras in 2016.

Heroes and villains

Signing for Marseille

Several players went from fan favorites to "traitors" during the 2000s after joining Le Classique arch-rivals Marseille directly from PSG. Team captain Frédéric Déhu and Fabrice Fiorèse were the first to experience this in 2004. PSG Academy idol Lorik Cana and Modeste M'bami followed suit in 2005 and 2006, respectively. Then it was Gabriel Heinze in 2009. He signed for Marseille despite saying he never would in the past. Whenever they returned to play at the Parc des Princes, the Parisian supporters welcomed them with insults, whistles and hostile banners.

Black players

Boulogne fans have a history of racial abuse towards their own black players. They taunted black French goalkeeper Bernard Lama when he arrived in 1992 to replace white idol Joël Bats, whistling him and displaying swastikas during games. Lama, however, went on to become a fan favorite and club legend for his performances. After his last match, Boulogne supporters refused to leave the stadium until Lama came to greet them.

Next up was Liberian striker George Weah in 1995. Having led Paris to the UEFA Champions League semifinals that year, he unfortunately was nonexistent versus A.C. Milan as PSG lost both matches. Additionally, he had told reporters after the return game that he wanted to sign for the Rossoneri next season. Parisian fans accused him of making a subpar display since he wanted to join the Italian club.

In his final game at the Parc des Princes, with his transfer confirmed, Boulogne fans insulted him and made monkey sounds every time he touched the ball. Hooligan group Casual Firm unfurled a racist banner that read "Weah, we don't need you" written with Celtic crosses and other neo-Nazi symbols. White midfielder David Ginola, who also wanted to leave the club, did not receive the same treatment.

In 2011, during former teammate Bernard Lama's testimonial match at the Parc des Princes, Weah told reporters he did not have a good memory of the stadium and was there only to honor his friend. In spite of this, most PSG supporters still consider him as a legendary player. Another incident that made headiness was Vikash Dhorasoo, a France international of Indian origin, being told by a Boulogne fan to "go sell peanuts in the metro" during a game in 2006.

Mateja Kežman

Serbian striker Mateja Kežman is one of the most unpopular figures to have ever played for the club. He was at the Parc des Princes between 2008 and 2010, scoring just five times across all competitions. Often jeered by fans with his on-pitch performances, Kežman reacted in the worst possible way in February 2009. With the Parisians trailing Bordeaux 1–0 at home in the Coupe de la Ligue semi-finals, Kežman was substituted after yet another poor display. Booed on his way off the pitch, he took off his shirt and threw it to the floor before disappearing down the tunnel. The club suspended him for two weeks and from that moment on Kežman was booed mercilessly until his last day in Paris.

Adrien Rabiot

Paris Saint-Germain Academy graduate Adrien Rabiot's fall from grace with the supporters was due to his selfish attitude throughout his PSG career, permanently complaining about his position on the field or threatening to leave for not playing enough, as well as endless contract talks every time the club made him a renewal offer. When it became clear Rabiot would not sign a new deal, the Parisian ultras unfurled a banner directed at him during a Coupe de la Ligue match against Orléans in December 2018. It read: "Rabiot, we don't need you." He was subsequently frozen out by the club for the remainder of the 2018–19 season and then signed with Juventus when his contract expired in the summer of 2019.

Neymar

Sought after to help Paris win the UEFA Champions League, the club paid Barcelona a world-record €222m in August 2017 for Neymar, who became an instant fan favorite and was welcomed with much fanfare by the CUP during his unveiling at the Parc des Princes. The Brazilian performed well when fit but missed half of his first two seasons through injury. He also fell out with fan favorite Edinson Cavani during a home game versus Dijon in January 2018. With Paris leading 7–0, Neymar refused to let Cavani take a penalty that would have made him the club's all-time top-scorer. He converted the spot-kick amongst whistles and chants of "Cavani, Cavani."

The final straw was his desire for a Barcelona return in 2019. The transfer fell threw in the end, and his comeback game versus Strasbourg at home in September was a nightmare. The ultras handed out flyers describing him as "the most disgusting player in PSG history," chanted "Neymar, son of a bitch," and booed him every time he touched the ball. They also displayed two banners, one calling Neymar a "whore" and the other prompting his father to sell him in a prostitution area of Rio de Janeiro. Neymar responded by scoring a last-minute bicycle kick to win 1–0, but he was still jeered. This would continue to be the case for most of 2019.

Neymar's road to redemption began during a home win over Galatasaray in December 2019. Leading 4–0, PSG were awarded a penalty and he personally handed the ball to Cavani, who was in the midst of a goalscoring drought. The Uruguayan scored and Neymar embraced him. In February 2020, though, PSG lost 2–1 away to Borussia Dortmund, leaving them on the brink of a fourth consecutive early exit. During PSG's next home match, the CUP unveiled a scathing banner that read: "Kombouaré, Gino, Raí, they had a winning mentality. Silva, Mbappé, Neymar – scared of winning? Grow some balls." Neymar went on to score the first goal in the 2–0 return leg win, guiding PSG to the quarterfinals at an empty Parc des Princes. Barred from the stadium due to the COVID-19 pandemic, around 3,000 ultras gathered outside it to cheer the team. After the final whistle, Neymar and his teammates thanked them from the balcony.

He led PSG to their first UEFA Champions League final ever that season and to the semifinals the following campaign, with CUP chairman Romain Mabille acknowledging on behalf of the group their appreciation for his displays and attitude. Whistles returned, however, during PSG's home matches versus Bordeaux and Lorient in March and April 2022 after a lackluster and injury-riddled season for Neymar, with the club also being ousted from the Champions League last-16 round for the third time in the five seasons in which he had been in Paris. He privately lamented a form of "ingratitude" on the part of the fans, all the while understanding their disappointment after yet another European collapse.

Neymar and the CUP were back on speaking terms in February 2023, when the Brazilian went to thank the ultras for their support after their loss to Bayern Munich in the UEFA Champions League, a first since 2019 and his failed transfer to Barcelona. The reconciliation was made possible following Romain Mabille's mea culpa over the banner that insulted his mother, as well as a positive exchange from the CUP leader with Neymar earlier that month.

Kylian Mbappé

Kylian Mbappé's relationship with the ultras was rather cold during his first five seasons at the club. The CUP felt that Mbappé, although born and raised in Paris, wasn't truly passionate about PSG and saw the club as a stepping stone before playing for Real Madrid. Kylian grew up idolising Madrid stars Cristiano Ronaldo and Zinedine Zidane, but he has also claimed several times that it was his childhood dream to play for PSG. In fact, Mbappé turned down Real to sign for the Parisians and bring the UEFA Champions League title to the Parc des Princes.

During the 2018–19 season, he twice argued with coach Thomas Tuchel after being substituted off, which for the supporters came across as arrogant and disrespectful to his teammates on the bench. That same campaign, after the shocking UCL loss to Manchester United, the ultras attended a training session where they proceeded to insult the players and Kylian in particular, who had missed a clear chance during the match. Then, during his acceptance speech upon being awarded Ligue 1 Player of the Year, Mbappé hinted that he could leave PSG if his demands for a bigger role in the team weren't met. The fans, who had questioned his lack of long-term commitment from the start, believed it was a salary increase strategy.

The following season, the CUP held up a banner calling out Kylian, Thiago Silva and Neymar for failing to 'man up' during PSG's loss away to Borussia Dortmund. His popularity took another blow in the 2020 UEFA Champions League final against Bayern Munich, with Kylian putting up a poor display in yet another big match as well as missing a rather easy goal. Amid speculation about his future during the 2020–21 campaign, the French star celebrated a goal against former club Monaco by kissing PSG's crest in front of the camera. The gesture was seen by PSG fans as a message to main suitors Real Madrid that he wanted to stay in Paris. This, coupled with Mbappé's showings in the UCL, including a hat-trick away to Barcelona and a brace at Bayern Munich to take PSG to the semifinals, gave a breath of fresh air to his relationship with the supporters.

The truce quickly came crashing down ahead of the 2021–22 season, when Kylian tried to join Real Madrid. PSG rejected the offers from the Spanish side and Mbappé began the campaign to the booing of the Parc des Princes, but his performances eventually won the ultras back. He led Paris to their tenth Ligue 1 title and was the only player beyond reproach in the club's UCL campaign, notably scoring twice against Madrid despite losing the tie. Real remained in contact with Mbappé during this season and believed he would join them next summer. Instead, Kylian snubbed Madrid for the second time and chose to sign a three-year contract extension with PSG to become the undisputed darling of the Parisian fans.

Edinson Cavani

Idolised by the ultras for his commitment, passion and a genuine love for the shirt, Uruguayan striker Edinson Cavani disappointed many of his admirers due to the way he left the club in June 2020. PSG offered "El Matador" the chance to extend his deal for two months so he could finish the 2019–20 UEFA Champions League, which had been rescheduled for August because of the COVID-19 pandemic. Annoyed at how the club had treated him, Cavani declined the offer and became a free agent. Throughout the season, PSG coach Thomas Tuchel put him aside by giving new signing Mauro Icardi more room, while sporting director Leonardo handled his departure in a clumsy and rushed way.

Nonetheless, the CUP still wanted to pay him tribute for his seven years at the French capital and his 200 goals scored. Except that since the end of his contract, Cavani walled in incomprehensible silence for PSG and his former fans. Although he would later thank them, the situation had already divided the ultras. CUP president Romain Mabille was amongst those who didn't want to honor him and resigned his post after a subgroup unilaterally decided to make a banner in Cavani's glory. Even if this episode hurt his legacy, Cavani remains a PSG legend for most fans.

Thomas Meunier

Thomas Meunier was an immediate fan favourite at the Parc des Princes after his good debut 2016–17 season. Supporters were fond of his hard-working approach on the pitch, as well as his straightforward and down to earth personality off it. Meunier was even touted as a potential future team captain until he liked a tweet praising the atmosphere created by the fans of PSG arch-rivals Marseille at the Stade Vélodrome ahead of their 2017–18 UEFA Europa League quarterfinal second leg win over RB Leipzig in April 2018.

The like enraged the Parisian fanbase, who were already sensitive by the perceived disrespectful behaviour shown by other players, most notably Neymar, towards the club. Meunier made things worse by responding to angry PSG fans on Twitter, calling them "pseudo-supporters" and that they needed to "know their place" as fans. The Belgian right back then said that he was answerable only to the ultras because of their unwavering support. But when he refused to apologise, as demanded by the Collectif Ultras Paris, his reputation amongst the supporters never recovered and he eventually left the club under controversial circumstances in June 2020. Meunier claimed that he wanted to stay at PSG and criticised sporting director Leonardo for not renewing his contract; it was later revealed that Leonardo did not offer him a contract extension because he had already signed with Borussia Dortmund.

Culture

Anthems and mottos

"Allez Paris!," recorded by Belgian actress and singer Annie Cordy in 1971, was the club's first official anthem. A PSG fan from the start, she was part of an association of hundreds of celebrities who contributed to the club's foundation in 1970. At the time, an appeal was made for anonymous people to buy subscription forms in kiosks. A year later, Cordy was named PSG's official godmother and she celebrated it by recording the aforementioned hymn.

The club's second anthem, "Allez Paris-Saint-Germain!" by Les Parisiens, was recorded in 1977, replacing Cordy's version. An initiative of historical PSG leader and music producer Charles Talar, he produced and released it under his homonym record label. The song's chorus became a popular chant among the Parisian supporters during games. A new version, also called "Allez Paris-Saint-Germain!," was recorded in 2010 as part of the club's 40th anniversary celebrations. Sung to the tune of "Go West" by Village People, the lyrics were rewritten with suggestions made by fans. This is the club's current official anthem. The song debuted in the 2010 edition of the Tournoi de Paris. PSG players and coach Carlo Ancelotti re-recorded it with their voices in 2012 at the request of the club's incoming Qatari owners.

"Ô Ville Lumière" ("Oh City of Light"), to the tune of "Flower of Scotland," is another veritable club anthem for PSG supporters. This chant was created by dissolved Kop of Boulogne ultra group Boulogne Boys. Other notable chants from supporters' groups in the Boulogne and Auteuil stands include "Le Parc est à nous" ("The Parc is ours"), "Ici, c'est Paris!" ("This is Paris!"), and "Paris est magique!" ("Paris is magical!"). Both stands began exchanging these chants during PSG matches in the 1990s. "Who Said I Would" by Phill Collins is also a traditional anthem for the fans. The song has accompanied the players' entry into the field since 1992, although it was temporarily replaced in September and August 2021.

"Ici, c'est Paris!" and "Paris est magique!" are also the club's most iconic mottos. The latter was created by dissolved Virage Auteuil ultra group Supras Auteuil, which patented it as a brand in 2008. A few years later, PSG began making use of the "Ici, c'est Paris!" slogan in its marketing (banners on the stands, TV adverts, merchandise) and Supras turned down the club's offer of €2,000 for the property rights in February 2016. A legal battle ensued between PSG and the group. They finally reached an agreement in August 2019. The club will be able to continue advertising the motto with supporters still allowed to make free use of it.

Famous fans

Former French president Nicolas Sarkozy is one of the club's most famous fans. He regularly attends home matches at the Parc des Princes and was a key figure behind the buyout of PSG by Qatar Sports Investments in June 2011. Other notable PSG fans include four-time NBA champion Tony Parker; MotoGP world champion Fabio Quartararo; American football legend Tom Brady; American actor Patrick Dempsey; tennis player Victoria Azarenka; judoka Teddy Riner; and record producer DJ Snake, among many others listed below.

  Nasser Al-Attiyah
  Richard Anconina
  Giannis Antetokounmpo
  Agathe Auproux
  Victoria Azarenka
  Nicolas Batum
  Jean-Paul Belmondo
  Malik Bentalha
  François Berléand
  Louis Bertignac
  Booba
  Tom Brady
  Patrick Bruel
  Jimmy Butler
  Annie Cordy
  Michel Cymes
  Gérard Darmon

  Jamel Debbouze
  Laurent Delahousse
  Cécile de Ménibus
  Patrick Dempsey
  Sacha Distel
  DJ Snake
  Kevin Durant  
  Nicolas Duvauchelle
  Jimmy Garoppolo
  Pierre Gasly
  Richard Gasquet
  Rudy Gobert
  Draymond Green
  Francis Huster
  JoeyStarr
  La Fouine
  Michaël Llodra

  Philippe Lucas
  Enrico Macias
  Boban Marjanović
  Mireille Mathieu
  Gaël Monfils
  Nagui
  Frank Ntilikina
  Joakim Noah
  Yannick Noah
  Josh Norman
  Sabrina Ouazani
  Tony Parker
  Fabio Quartararo
  Teddy Riner
  Nicolas Sarkozy
  Karl-Anthony Towns
  Michaël Youn

References

External links

Official websites
PSG.FR - Site officiel du Paris Saint-Germain
Paris Saint-Germain - Ligue 1
Paris Saint-Germain - UEFA.com

Paris Saint-Germain F.C.
Association football supporters